Robert Donnelly may refer to:

 Bobby Donnelly (born 1987), Scottish footballer with Airdrie United
 Bobby Donnelly (lawn bowls) (born 1962), South African lawn bowler
 Bob Donnelly, American lawyer
 Bob Donnelly (footballer) ( 1930s), Scottish footballer with Partick Thistle and Manchester City
 Robert True Donnelly (1924–1999), judge on the Missouri Supreme Court
 Robert William Donnelly (1931–2014), American bishop of the Catholic Church

See also
 Robert Donley (born 1934), American artist
 J. Robert Donnelly Husky Heritage Sports Museum, at the University of Connecticut's main campus